Villa Portales Airport,  is an airport  east-northeast of Lonquimay, a town in the Araucanía Region of Chile.

The airport is in the Andean valley of the Lonquimay River. There is mountainous terrain in all quadrants.

See also

Transport in Chile
List of airports in Chile

References

External links
OpenStreetMap - Villa Portales
OurAirports - Villa Portales
SkyVector - Villa Portales

Airports in Chile
Airports in La Araucanía Region